Landing Ground 174 is an abandoned World War II military airfield in Egypt, east of El Alamein, about 80 km southwest of Alexandria.

It was used by the Ninth Air Force of the United States Army Air Forces during the Western Desert Campaign by the British Eighth Army, which the 57th Fighter Group, flew P-40 Warhawks  from on 16 September-5 November 1942.

Close examination of aerial photography of the hard desert about 10 miles east of El Alamein shows some evidence of disturbance which could indicate where it existed.

See also
 List of North African airfields during World War II

References

 Maurer, Maurer. Air Force Combat Units of World War II. Maxwell AFB, Alabama: Office of Air Force History, 1983. .

External links

Airfields of the United States Army Air Forces in Egypt
World War II airfields in Egypt
Airports established in 1942
1942 establishments in Egypt